Town Point may refer to:
 Spencers Wharf, Maryland, a hamlet formerly named Town Point
Town Point (Dover, Delaware), listed on the National Register of Historic Places in Kent County, Delaware

See also
Town Point Park, a park in Norfolk, Virginia